Quintus Mamilius Vitulus was a Roman politician of the third century BC. He was brother of Lucius Mamilius Vitulus, consul in 265 BC.

According to tradition, his family, plebeian, was a native of the princely family of Tusculum.

In 262 BC, during the third year of the First Punic War, he was elected consul. With his colleague Lucius Postumius Megellus, he besieged the Sicilian city of Agrigentum and won a victory over a Carthaginian mercenary army which had come to relieve the city.

References
 William Smith, Dictionary of Greek and Roman Biography and Mythology, 1, Boston: Little, Brown and Company, Vol. 3 p. 1279

Mamilii
3rd-century BC Roman consuls
3rd-century BC Roman generals